John Hickman (September 11, 1810 – March 23, 1875) was a Republican, Democratic and Anti-Lecompton Democratic member of the U.S. House of Representatives for Pennsylvania's 6th congressional district from 1855 to 1863.

Early life

John Hickman was born in West Bradford Township, Pennsylvania.  He pursued English and classical studies under private tutors.  He began the study of medicine but abandoned it for the study of law.  He was admitted to the bar in 1833 and commenced practice in West Chester.  He was a delegate to the Democratic convention at Baltimore in 1844.  He served as district attorney for Chester County, Pennsylvania, in 1845 and 1846.

United States House of Representatives

Hickman was elected as a Democrat to the Thirty-fourth and Thirty-fifth Congresses, as an Anti-Lecompton Democrat to the Thirty-sixth Congress, and as a Republican to the Thirty-seventh Congress.  He served as chairman of the United States House Committee on Revolutionary Pensions during the Thirty-fifth Congress and the United States House Committee on the Judiciary during the Thirty-sixth and Thirty-seventh Congresses.  At the 1860 Republican National Convention, Hickman finished 3rd in the race for the vice-presidential nomination, behind Hannibal Hamlin and Cassius Clay

At a political dinner in Philadelphia a week after South Carolina declared secession from the Union, Hickman made a fiery speech calling for war, reported on the front page of the Philadelphia Inquirer on December 29, 1860:
The time for action has arrived; every man must define his position; there is an eternal conflict between freedom and slavery; truces which will last cannot be formed between them. . . . You must now make up your minds whether to serve God or Belial.  (Cheers.) . . . For myself I say distinctly — No more compromises.  (Long continued applause.)  I love the Constitution and the Union, but I will not buy them from an enemy.  (Cries of good.) . . . South Carolina is not out of the Union, and by the blessing of Almighty God she never will be out of the Union.  (Uproarious cheers.)  And if you believe as I do, she never will be out of the Union.  (Cheers.)  The eighteen millions of the North are not to be put down by the eight millions of the South.  The prospect is indeed gloomy.  We have a traitor President and a corrupt and rotten Cabinet.  But with all the banded seceding States and their traitor friends, we will yet save the Union.  (Cheers.) . . . The South thinks the North is craven, and our Union-saving merchants encourage that belief.  I want to know whether every man is going to purchase a peace or defend the peace. (Cheers.)

He declined to be a candidate for renomination in 1862.  He was one of the managers appointed by the House of Representatives in 1862 to conduct the impeachment proceedings against West H. Humphreys, United States judge for the several districts of Tennessee.

He resumed the practice of law and served as a member of the Pennsylvania House of Representatives in 1869.  He died in West Chester and is interred in Oaklands Cemetery.

Notes

Sources

The Political Graveyard

External links
 

Members of the Pennsylvania House of Representatives
Pennsylvania lawyers
1810 births
1875 deaths
Burials at Oaklands Cemetery
People from Chester County, Pennsylvania
Pennsylvania Republicans
Republican Party members of the United States House of Representatives from Pennsylvania
Democratic Party members of the United States House of Representatives from Pennsylvania
19th-century American politicians
19th-century American lawyers